Stripe, striped, or stripes may refer to:

Decorations
Stripe (pattern), a line or band that differs in colour or tone from an adjacent surface
Racing stripe, a vehicle decoration
Service stripe, a decoration of the U.S. military

Entertainment
Stripes (film), a 1981 American comedy film directed by Ivan Reitman
Striped 2, a television ident for BBC Two television
S.T.R.I.P.E., a fictional superhero in the DC Comics universe
Stripe, the main antagonist character in the film Gremlins
"Stripes", an episode of the British sitcom Hi-de-Hi!

Organizations
Stripe, Inc., an online payment processor
Stripes Convenience Stores, a chain of convenience stores in Texas, New Mexico, and Oklahoma
Stripes (growth equity firm), a New York-based growth equity firm that invests in private software and branded consumer products companies
Stripe, brand name for the first striped toothpaste

Technology
Stripes (framework), an open source web application framework based on the model–view–controller (MVC)
Data striping, a data storage technique
Magnetic stripe, a method for storing data, such as on a credit card

Other uses
Stripe (billiard ball), billiard balls numbered 9 through 15
Stripes (prison uniform), the uniform worn by detainees
Stripe, County Fermanagh, a townland in Northern Ireland; see List of townlands in County Fermanagh

See also
Candy stripe (disambiguation)
Chevron (insignia), a V-shaped pattern often used in police or military uniforms
Stars and bars (disambiguation)
Stars & Stripes (disambiguation)
Strip (disambiguation)
Striper Morone saxatilis, a marine fish
Stryper, a glam metal band from Orange County, California
Warming stripes, a data visualization technique for global warming